Azhagi is an Indian Tamil-language television soap opera that aired on Sun TV from 10 October 2011 to 4 March 2016 for 1101 episodes.

The show starred Viji Chandrasekhar, Kamal Deep, Soniya and Ilavarasan. It was produced by Vikatan Televistas Pvt Ltd and director by V.C Ravi, A. Jawahar, E. Vikramadhithan and M.Iniyan Dinesh.

The series has been remade into Telugu language as Amma broadcast on Gemini TV, and Malayalam language as Amma Manasam broadcast on Surya TV.

Plot synopsis
Azhagi is the story of Sundari (Viji Chandrasekhar), 40-year-old widow, who has struggled for the last 20 years with the sole aim of bringing up her children all by herself. The story underscores how this vulnerable yet resilient widow battles the hardships life throws at her.

Cast

 Viji Chandrasekhar as Sundari Kathirvelan 
 Kamal Deep as Natraj Kathirvelan (Kathirvelan and Sundari's son)
 Soniya as Divya Natraj (Natraj's wife and Sundari's daughter-in-law and Chandra's daughter)
 Nithya Ravindran as Major Amma
 Sulakshana / Surekha as Chandra (Divya and Nimmi's mother)
 Shalu Kurian / Kutty Pooja / Dhesikha as Niraimathi (Mathi) (Sundari and Kathiravan's oldest daughter and Somu's ex-wife and Babu's wife)
 Arun Kumar Rajan / J.Durai Raj as Somusundaram (Somu) (Sundari's ex-son-in-law, Panchali's son and Mathi's ex-husband)
 Sujatha Selvaraj as Panchali (Somu's mother)
 Radha as Surya Marisamy (Sundari and Kathirvelan's younger daughter and Marisamy's wife)
 Satish Kumar as Marisamy (Sundari's son-in-law/ Surya Kathirvelan's husband)
 Nanjil Nalini as Jegathambal (Sundari's mother-in-law and Kathirvelan and Durai's mother)
 Ilavarasu / Sridhar as Durai (Kathirvelan's brother and Sundari's brother-in-law and Vasantha's husband)
 Nagalakshmi as Vasantha Durai (Durai's wife)
 Ashwin as Sanjay Durai (Durai and Vasantha's son)
 Niranjini Ashok / Vineetha as Nithya Durai / Nithya Babu (Durai's daughter and Babu's ex-wife)
 Vincent Roy as Kalithirthan
 Ganesh Gopinath / Iyyappan Unni as Babu Kalithirthan (Kalitheerthan's son and Nithya's ex-husband and Mathi's husband)
 Harikrishnan as Shyam (Natraj Kathiravan's best friend and Kalithirthan's son in-law)
 Srividya as Nirmala "Nimmi" Prabhu (Divya's sister and Chandra's daughter)
 Jaheer Hassain as Prabhu (Divya's brother-in-law, Chandra's son in-law and Nimmi's husband)
 Madhumitha as Chitra
 Deepa Shankar as Sridevi

Original soundtrack

Title song
It was written by Yugabharathi, composed by the Kiran. It was sung by Haricharan.

Soundtrack

Production
The series was directed by V.C Ravi (1-502), A. Jawahar (503-595) E.Vikramadhithan and M.Iniyan Dinesh. It was produced by Vikatan Televistas Pvt Ltd.

Remake
The series has been remade into Telugu language as Amma broadcast on Gemini TV and Malayalam language as Amma Manasam broadcast on Surya TV.

Awards and nominations

See also
 List of programs broadcast by Sun TV

References

External links
 Official Website 

Sun TV original programming
2011 Tamil-language television series debuts
2010s Tamil-language television series
Tamil-language television shows
2016 Tamil-language television series endings